Bonassola is a comune (municipality) in the Province of La Spezia in the Italian region Liguria, located about  southeast of Genoa and about  northwest of La Spezia.

The municipality of Bonassola contains the frazioni (subdivisions, mainly villages and hamlets) Montaretto, Costella, Serra, Scernio, and San Giorgio.

Bonassola borders the following municipalities: Framura, Levanto.

History
During World War II, two American fifteen men missions tried to land and blow up a railway tunnel between Framura and Bonassola. Both missions failed; the second mission's soldiers were executed and buried in a mass grave by the German Army.

Demographic evolution

See also
La Francesca

References

External links

 
 www.comune.bonassola.sp.it/
 Bonassola

Coastal towns in Liguria
Cities and towns in Liguria